Getachew Kassa (Amharic: ጌታቸው ካሳ; born 6 September 1944) is an Ethiopian singer and percussionist. He was famous at the height of 1960s and 1970s after hiring to the country's famous clubs, the Sombrino and Axum Hall, which made him eligible to professional skills.

Early life
Getachew Kassa was born in Addis Ababa, Ethiopian Empire. He began singing at the age of six, despite there was discouragement by his parents. During this stage, Getachew liked an Italian song named "Azemerina". He began pleasing his parents and changed his actual surname to "Kassa". Later, he occasionally to sing for his friends and at home.

Career
As a young man, he started playing with a band called Fetan Band – or Speed Band – at the Patrice Lumumba Bar in Wube Berha in the 1970s. Getachew established himself as one of the most accomplished Ethiopian musicians of the period. Notable songs include "Addis Ababa", "Tiz Balegn Gize", "Yekereme Fikir", "Bertucan nesh lomi" "Bichayan Tekze" "Agere Tizitash". He played for various groups, such as the Sehebelles, the Venus Band, and later with the Walias Band. His songs "Tezata Slow" and "Fast" were featured on the album Ethiopiques, Vol. 10: Ethiopian Blues & Ballads. The Sombrino club—was very popular in 1960s and 1970s— hired him to play accordion. He met with singer Alemayehu Eshete there. Then Getachew spent playing accordion for 15 birr at night. While there, Getachew managed to create many singles. Subsequently, he moved to another famous club called Axum Hall, playing for Venus Club and Taytu Hotel, thereafter quickly famed at the era.  

Getachew moved to the United States in 1981, and lived for many years. In the mid-1980s, he toured through the states and drew attention to the fate of the people who had been struck by hunger in Ethiopia. After publishing his first CD in 1983, he returned back to Ethiopia and again went in the U.S. in 1991. His self-image as a "world citizen" brought him the status of an illegal immigrant. But it was not until the year 2012 that Ethiopia returned. 

In 2012, Nahom Records released an album The Best of Getachew Kassa. Kassa was a part of the Stay Strong Project's Stay Strong Orchestra alongside Alemayehu Eshete and a songwriter and singer.

Discography

References

1944 births
Living people
Ethiopian musicians
20th-century Ethiopian male singers
People from Addis Ababa